Shenfugang Town, is an urban town in Liling City, Zhuzhou City, Hunan Province, People's Republic of China.

Cityscape
The town is divided into 9 villages and 2 communities, the following areas: Changshaling Community, Shenfugang Community, Tiehekou Village, Fengshushan Village, Tangjiaping Village, Xitangping Village, Daxilong Village, Xiaoxi Village, Longhu Village, Xiasanzhou Village, and Zhuanbu Village.

References

Historic township-level divisions of Liling